Doorndraai Dam Nature Reserve, is situated south west of Potgietersrus, in the Limpopo, Province of South Africa, it has an area of about 7,000 ha. It encloses the Doorndraai Dam reservoir.

Wildlife
Fauna in the reserve includes waterbuck, kudu, bush buck, mountain reedbuck, blue wildebeest, zebra, giraffe and warthog. Less common sightings include leopard, Southern African wildcat, aardvark and hedgehog.

See also
 Protected areas of South Africa
 Limpopo Tourism and Parks Board

Nature reserves in South Africa